Juanito also known as Viva Juanito! is a 1960 Argentine, Spanish, West German international co-production film set during the Mexican Revolution.

Cast
 Pablito Calvo - Juanito
 Georg Thomalla - Paddy 
 Sabine Bethmann - Carmencita
 Hans von Borsody - Tom
 Pilar Cansino - Luisa 
 Ángel Ortiz - Pedrillo 
 José Marco Davó- General Vegas
 Antonio Casas - President Meza 
 Alfredo Mayo - Colonel Cuesta 
 Félix Fernández - Doctor Agapito

External links
 

1960 films
1960 Western (genre) films
Argentine Western (genre) films
German Western (genre) films
German children's films
Spanish adventure films
Spanish children's films
West German films
1960s Spanish-language films
Mexican Revolution films
1960s Argentine films
1960s German films